Quiberville is a commune in the Seine-Maritime department in the Normandy region in northern France.

Geography

This is a village based on tourism and farming, situated by the mouth of the river Saâne in the Pays de Caux. Huge chalk cliffs face a pebble beach and the English Channel.

Heraldry

Population

Places of interest
 The church of St. Valery, dating from the twelfth century.
 A stone cross dated 1602.

See also
Communes of the Seine-Maritime department

References

External links

 Website of Quiberville sailing club 

Communes of Seine-Maritime
Populated coastal places in France